Gnathopogon polytaenia is a species of ray-finned fish in the genus Gnathopogon endemic to China.

References

Gnathopogon
Cyprinid fish of Asia
Freshwater fish of China
Fish described in 1925